The Lake County Record-Bee is a newspaper in the town of Lakeport, California. It is owned by MediaNews Group, who bought the paper in 2001.

External links
 

MediaNews Group publications
Lake County, California
Lakeport, California